The Bowili (Bowiri) language, Tuwuli (Liwuli, Siwuri, Tuwili, Tora), is spoken in the Volta Region of Ghana. It is considered one of the Ghana–Togo Mountain languages of the Kwa family.

References

Ghana–Togo Mountain languages
Languages of Ghana